Amiral Charner (F 727) was a  of the French Navy. She was later transferred to National Navy of Uruguay in 1991 and renamed Montevideo. The ship was scrapped in 2016.

Development and design 

The main gun armament of the Commandant Rivière class consisted of three of the new French  guns, with a single turret located forward and two turrets aft. These water-cooled automatic dual-purpose guns could fire a  shell at an effective range of  against surface targets and  against aircraft at a rate of 60 rounds per minute. Two triple torpedo tubes were fitted for anti-submarine torpedoes, while the ship's armament was completed by two  Hotchkiss HS-30 cannon. The ships had accommodation for an 80-man commando detachment with two fast landing boats, each capable of landing 25 personnel.

Construction and career 
Amiral Charner was laid down in November 1958 and launched on 12 March 1960 at Arsenal de Lorient in Lorient. The vessel was commissioned on 14 December 1962.

The frigate was sold to Uruguay in 1991 and given the new name Montevideo. The ship remained in service until 2008. She was sold for scrap in 2016.

References

1960 ships
Commandant Rivière-class frigates